The Group of Friends in Defense of the Charter of the United Nations is a grouping at the United Nations, established in July 2021, in New York, by 17 U.N. Member States; namely, (Algeria, Angola, Belarus, Bolivia, Cambodia, China, Cuba, North Korea, Eritrea, Iran, Laos, Nicaragua, Russia, Saint Vincent and the Grenadines, Palestine, Syria, and Venezuela). Subsequently, Equatorial Guinea, Zimbabwe, and Mali have joined the Group, expanding its current membership to 20 countries. 

The main goal of the grouping is to issue a message in support of the United Nations' founding treaty, commonly referred to as the UN Charter, seeking to promote multilateralism and diplomacy over the use of force against perceived violations from other UN Member States.

The March 10 2021 concept note said "the world is seeing a growing resort to unilateralism, marked by isolationist and arbitrary actions, including the imposition of unilateral coercive measures or the withdrawal from landmark agreements and multilateral institutions, as well as by attempts to undermine critical efforts to tackle common and global challenges." 

In September 2022, 5 additional countries (being Burundi, Ethiopia, Namibia, South Africa and Vietnam) as well as Mali (now an official member) participated as guests and/or observer(s) at the 3rd Ministerial Meeting of the Group of Friends, held in New York City, on the margins of the High-Level Week of the UN General Assembly.

The Group of Friends operates in New York, since its establishment in July 2021, and during first quarter of 2023 initiated its activities in Geneva. The Members of the Group of Friends have agreed to continue identifying other potential spaces for expanding the scope of action of the grouping, particularly to other cities that host United Nations Offices or other International Organizations.

Membership
The following countries are the members of the Group of Friends in Defense of the UN Charter, with a breakdown by continents as follows: 7 in Asia, 6 in Africa, 3 in North America, 2 in Europe, and 2 in South America.

References

External links 
 Group of Friends in Defense of the Charter of the United Nations

2021 in international relations
Organizations established in 2021